The Oyoko Clan is one of the eight major Abusua and its characteristic is patience. It is a clan from Ghana and the origins of the clan can be traced back to at least .
The Oyoko Clan is bigger than Asante. The Oyoko family traces its origins to the contemporary Akan Town of Techiman. The original Oyoko royal family of Techimanhene’s palace. The Asantehene and Techimanhene are of the same clan!

Totem
The Totem of the Oyoko people is the falcon or hawk.

Major towns
The royal family from which the Asantehene comes from are Oyoko people. Its main towns are Kumasi, Dwaben, Nsuta and Ejisu. Other towns are Kokofu, Bekwae, Mamponten, Bogyae, Dadieso, Bankame, Obogu, Asaaman Adubiase, Pampaso, Kontanase, Kenyase, Ntonso and Boagyaa.

References

Akan culture